In mathematics, specifically in number theory, a binomial number is an integer which can be obtained by evaluating a homogeneous polynomial containing two terms. It is a generalization of a Cunningham number.

Definition 

A binomial number is an integer obtained by evaluating a homogeneous polynomial containing two terms, also called a binomial. Binomial numbers formed this way form Lucas sequences. Specifically:

 and 

Binomial numbers are a generalization of a Cunningham numbers, and it will be seen that the Cunningham numbers are binomial numbers where . Other subsets of the binomial numbers are the Mersenne numbers and the repunits.

Factorization 

The main reason for studying these numbers is to obtain their factorizations. Aside from algebraic factors, which are obtained by factoring the underlying polynomial (binomial) that was used to define the number, such as difference of two squares and sum of two cubes, there are other prime factors (called primitive prime factors, because for a given  they do not factorize  with ) which occur seemingly at random, and it is these which the number theorist is looking for.

Some binomial numbers' underlying binomials have Aurifeuillian factorizations, which can assist in finding prime factors. Cyclotomic polynomials are also helpful in finding factorizations.

The amount of work required in searching for a factor is considerably reduced by applying Legendre's theorem. This theorem states that all factors of a binomial number are of the form  if  is even or  if it is odd.

Observation 

Some people write "binomial number" when they mean binomial coefficient, but this usage is not standard and is deprecated.

See also
Cunningham project

References

External links
Binomial Number at MathWorld

Number theory